"Paul Revere's Ride" is an 1860 poem by American poet Henry Wadsworth Longfellow that commemorates the actions of American patriot Paul Revere on April 18, 1775, although with significant inaccuracies. It was first published in the January 1861 issue of The Atlantic Monthly. It was later retitled "The Landlord's Tale" in Longfellow's 1863 collection Tales of a Wayside Inn.

Overview
The poem is spoken by the landlord of the Wayside Inn and tells a partly fictionalized story of Paul Revere. In the poem, Revere tells a friend to prepare signal lanterns in the Old North Church (North End, Boston) to inform him whether the British will attack by land or sea. He would await the signal across the river in Charlestown and be ready to spread the alarm throughout Middlesex County, Massachusetts. The unnamed friend climbs up the steeple and soon sets up two signal lanterns, informing Revere that the British are coming by sea. Revere rides his horse through Medford, Lexington, and Concord to warn the patriots.

Composition and publication history

Longfellow was inspired to write the poem after visiting the Old North Church and climbing its tower on April 5, 1860. He began writing the poem the next day. It was first published in the January 1861 issue of The Atlantic Monthly. It was later re-published in Longfellow's Tales of a Wayside Inn as "The Landlord's Tale" in 1863. The poem served as the first in a series of 22 narratives bundled as a collection, similar to Geoffrey Chaucer's The Canterbury Tales, and was published in three installments over 10 years.

Longfellow's family had a connection to the historical Paul Revere. His maternal grandfather, Peleg Wadsworth, was Revere's commander on the Penobscot Expedition.

Analysis
When the poem was written in 1860, America was on the verge of Civil War. Longfellow first came forward publicly as an abolitionist in 1842 with the publication of his Poems on Slavery. Though he admitted the book made little impact, it was written for his best friend, Charles Sumner, an activist abolitionist politician with whom he would continue to share common cause on the issues of slavery and the Union. "Paul Revere's Ride" was published in the January 1861, issue of The Atlantic magazine on December 20, 1860, just as South Carolina became the first state to secede from the United States. The poem was meant to appeal to Northerners' sense of urgency and, as a call for action, noted that history favors the courageous. Longfellow, who often used poetry to remind readers of cultural and moral values, warns at the end of the poem of a coming "hour of darkness and peril and need", implying the breakup of the Union, and suggests that the "people will waken and listen to hear" the midnight message again. By emphasizing common history, he was attempting to dissolve social tensions.

The phrase "Hardly a man is now alive" was true as one of the last men alive at the time had only recently died. Jonathan Harrington, the young fifer for Lexington's militia during the battles of Lexington and Concord, died at the age of 96 in 1854, a few years before the poem was written. The poem fluctuates between past and present tense, sometimes in the same sentence, symbolically pulling the actions of the Revolution into modern times and displaying an event with timeless sympathies.

Longfellow's poem is not historically accurate but his "mistakes" were deliberate. He had researched the historical event, using works like George Bancroft's History of the United States, but he manipulated the facts for poetic effect. He was purposefully trying to create American legends, much as he did with works like The Song of Hiawatha (1855) and The Courtship of Miles Standish (1858).

Critical response

Modern

Modern critics of the poem emphasize not the poem's overall quality of writing, but its many historical inaccuracies. For example, the poem depicts the lantern signal in the Old North Church as meant for Revere, but actually the signal was from Revere: the historical Paul Revere did not receive the lantern signal, but actually was the one who ordered it to be set up. The poem also depicts Revere rowing himself across the Charles River when, in reality, he was rowed over by others. He also did not reach Concord that night. Another inaccuracy is a general lengthening of the time frame of the night's events.

The majority of criticism, however, notes that Longfellow gave sole credit to Revere for the collective achievements of three riders (as well as other riders, whose names do not survive to history). In fact, Revere and William Dawes rode (via different routes) from Boston to Lexington to warn John Hancock and Samuel Adams that British soldiers were marching from Boston to Lexington to arrest Hancock and Adams and seize the weapons stores in Concord. Revere and Dawes rode toward Concord, where the militia's arsenal was hidden; they were joined by Samuel Prescott, a doctor who lived in Concord and happened to be in Lexington. Revere, Dawes, and Prescott were stopped by British troops in Lincoln on the road to Concord. Prescott and Dawes escaped, but Revere was detained and questioned and then escorted at gunpoint by three British officers back to Lexington. Of the three riders, only Prescott arrived at Concord in time to warn the militia there.

Historical impact 

Longfellow's poem is credited with creating the national legend of Paul Revere, a previously little-known Massachusetts silversmith. Upon Revere's death in 1818, for example, his obituary did not mention his midnight ride but instead focused on his business sense and his many friends. The fame that Longfellow brought to Revere, however, did not materialize until after the Civil War amidst the Colonial Revival Movement of the 1870s. In 1875, for example, the Old North Church mentioned in the poem began an annual custom called the "lantern ceremony" recreating the action of the poem. Three years later, the Church added a plaque noting it as the site of "the signal lanterns of Paul Revere". Revere's elevated historical importance also led to unsubstantiated rumors that he made a set of false teeth for George Washington. Revere's legendary status continued for decades and, in part due to Longfellow's poem, authentic silverware made by Revere commanded high prices. Wall Street tycoon J. P. Morgan, for example, offered $100,000 for a punch bowl Revere made.

In 1883, Boston held a national competition for an equestrian statue of Revere. It was won by Cyrus Edwin Dallin, although his model was not accepted until 1899, and the statue was not dedicated until 1940. It stands in "Paul Revere Plaza," opposite the Old North Church.

In 1896 Helen F. Moore, dismayed that William Dawes had been forgotten, penned a parody of Longfellow's poem:
 'Tis all very well for the children to hear
 Of the midnight ride of Paul Revere;
 But why should my name be quite forgot,
 Who rode as boldly and well, God wot?
 Why should I ask? The reason is clear—
 My name was Dawes and his Revere.

For a long time, historians of the American Revolution as well as textbook writers relied almost entirely on Longfellow's poem as historical evidence – creating substantial misconceptions in the minds of the American people. In re-examining the episode, some historians in the 20th century have attempted to demythologize Paul Revere almost to the point of marginalization. While it is true that Revere was not the only rider that night, that does not refute the fact that Revere successfully completed the first phase of his mission to warn Adams and Hancock. Other historians have since stressed Revere's importance, including David Hackett Fischer in his book Paul Revere's Ride (1995), a scholarly study of Revere's role in the opening of the Revolution.

In 2007, the United States Postal Service (USPS) issued a commemorative stamp with images referencing the poem. Longfellow is represented by a painting by artist Kazuhiko Sano.

References  
 Citations

Further reading

External links 

 
Original text of "Paul Revere's Ride" by The Atlantic
Discussion of "Paul Revere's Ride" by the Maine Historical Society
"Paul Revere's Ride" lesson plan  by the National Endowment for the Humanities
"Spotty History, Maybe, but Great Literature"—The Wall Street Journal on "Paul Revere's Ride"
"150 Years of 'Paul Revere's Ride': About the Poem"
 

American poems
Poetry by Henry Wadsworth Longfellow
Poems about the American Revolution
1861 poems
1775 in the Thirteen Colonies
Cultural depictions of Paul Revere
Works originally published in The Atlantic (magazine)